Nir Yisrael (lit. Yisrael's Meadow) is a moshav in southern Israel. Located near Ashkelon, it falls under the jurisdiction of Hof Ashkelon Regional Council.

History
The moshav was founded in 1949 by Jewish immigrants from Czechoslovakia and Hungary who were members of the Jewish youth movement HaNoar HaTzioni. It was named after Yisrael Tiber, who donated large amounts of money to the Jewish National Fund.

References

External links
Official website   

Moshavim
Populated places established in 1949
Populated places in Southern District (Israel)
1949 establishments in Israel
Czech-Jewish culture in Israel
Hungarian-Jewish culture in Israel
Slovak-Jewish culture in Israel